Yerjan (also Romanized as Yerjān) is a village in Sagezabad Rural District, in the Central District of Buin Zahra County, Qazvin Province, Iran. At the 2006 census, its population was 599, in 145 families.

References 

Populated places in Buin Zahra County